Sorkh Qaleh (also Romanized as Sorkh Qal‘eh and Sorkhqal‘eh) is a village in Sorkh Qaleh Rural District, in the Central District of Qaleh Ganj County, Kerman Province, Iran. At the 2006 census, its population was 786, in 167 families.

References 

Populated places in Qaleh Ganj County